William Willis may refer to:

Politicians
William Willis (Maine politician) (1794–1870), American politician and historian, mayor of Portland, Maine, 1857
William Willis Garth (1828–1912), American politician
William Willis (British politician) (1835–1911), British politician, MP for Colchester 1880–1885
William Jarvis Willis (1840–1884), New Zealand politician
William Nicholas Willis (1858–1922), Australian politician

Others
William Downes Willis (1790–1871), British clergyman, theologian and author
William Willis (physician) (1837–1894), British physician
William Willis (inventor) (1841–1923), British inventor 
William Willis (sailor) (1893–1968), rafter and adventurer
William Hailey Willis (1916–2000), American classicist
William S. Willis (1921–1983), ethnohistorian and pioneer in African American anthropology
William Willis (artist) (born 1943), American artist

See also
Bill Willis (1921–2007), American football player